Zimmerberg may refer to:

 Zimmerberg, a mountain and a region located in the district of Horgen in the canton of Zurich, Switzerland
 Zimmerberg Base Tunnel, a railway tunnel in Switzerland
 Zimmerberg bus line, a bus line network in the canton of Zürich in Switzerland